A feather duster is a cleaning tool that is typically made from a wooden dowel handle onto which feathers are wound with a wire. Some dusters have a retractable casing instead of a dowel handle and these are typically used by rack-jobbers and truck drivers who need to clean store shelves, and can retract the feathers into the handle to avoid damage.

Feather dusters serve the same function as soft brooms or brushes, except that they are only meant to remove loose superficial dust from delicate surfaces (such as paintings and papercrafts) or around fragile items (such as porcelain and glassware).  They are effective in cleaning tight areas, or areas where there are many odds and ends. The individual feathers are flexible and can reach into gaps and crevices without disturbing the surrounding, and the tiny barbules on the feathers themselves that act as "fingers" to collect and remove dust particles.

History

In 1870, the idea for the feather duster was conceived in a broom factory in Jones County, Iowa, U.S. A farmer brought a bundle of turkey feathers into the factory asking if they could be used to assemble a brush. E. E. Hoag split them with a pocket knife and mounted them on a short broomstick. But the result was  too stiff for use. In 1874, the Hoag Duster Company was founded in Iowa.

In 1874, Susan Hibbard of Geneva Lake, Wisconsin, U.S., used discarded turkey feathers in a feather duster. Hibbard filed a patent (U.S. patent #177,939) on November 13, 1874 which was issued on May 30, 1876. After a hard-fought legal battle against her husband George, and the National Feather Duster Company in December 1881, the United States Court of Appeals for the Seventh Circuit in Chicago ruled in favor of Susan giving her priority of invention of the feather duster.

The Chicago Feather Duster Company was established in 1875. It received a patent for cuff on December 22, 1906, and for the head on September 17, 1907.

South African ostrich feather dusters were developed in Johannesburg in 1903 by Harry S. Beckner, a missionary and broom factory manager. He felt that ostrich feathers made a convenient tool for cleaning machines at the factory. His first ostrich feather dusters were wound on broom handles using the same foot-powered kick winders and wire used to attach broom straw. 

The first ostrich feather duster company in the United States was formed in 1913 by brothers Harry and George Beckner in Athol, Massachusetts and is now run by George's great granddaughter, Margret Fish Rempher.

The largest manufacturer of ostrich feather dusters is Klein Karoo International (Feathers) in Oudtshoorn, South Africa.

Types
There are several types of feathers used in feather dusters, but ostrich feathers are most often used.

Black ostrich feathers come from the male and are very soft with feathers that are more "stringy" in nature. Gray ostrich feathers are more stark than the black feathers and are often sold at grocery stores. Floss ostrich feathers are the most soft and delicate feathers and come from underneath the bird's wings. Floss ostrich feathers are more expensive. Chick feathers are more pointed and stark than ostrich feathers, are usually sold at very low prices.

In Indonesia and Thailand, feather dusters are normally made of chicken feathers. They are attached to a length of bamboo, and feathers are commonly present along most of the stick.

Footnotes

Cleaning tools
Feathers
Ostriches